In domain theory, a branch of mathematics and computer science, a Scott information system is a primitive kind of logical deductive system often used as an alternative way of presenting Scott domains.

Definition
A Scott information system, A, is an ordered triple 
 
 
 
satisfying
 
 
 
  
 

Here  means

Examples

Natural numbers
The return value of a partial recursive function, which either returns a natural number or goes into an infinite recursion, can be expressed as a simple Scott information system as follows:
 
 
 

Propositional calculus
The propositional calculus gives us a very simple Scott information system as follows:

Scott domains
Let D be a Scott domain. Then we may define an information system as follows

  the set of compact elements of 
 
 

Let  be the mapping that takes us from a Scott domain, D, to the information system defined above.

Information systems and Scott domains
Given an information system, we can build a Scott domain as follows. 

 Definition:  is a point if and only if
 
 

Let  denote the set of points of A with the subset ordering.  will be a countably based Scott domain when T is countable. In general, for any Scott domain D and information system A
 
 
where the second congruence is given by approximable mappings.

See also
 Scott domain
 Domain theory

References

 Glynn Winskel: "The Formal Semantics of Programming Languages: An Introduction", MIT Press, 1993 (chapter 12)

Models of computation
Domain theory